The California Southern Baptist Convention (CSBC) is the state convention of the Southern Baptist Convention in California. CSBC includes 1,800 member churches which in turn have 450,000 members. Additionally the CSBC controls and financially supports California Baptist University.

CSBC was founded in 1940 as the Southern Baptist General Convention of California. The convention changed its name to its current name in 1988.

CSBC's Executive Director leading day-to-day operations of the convention is Bill Agee.

Several times in recent decades efforts to change the name of the convention to remove "Southern" have failed.

References

Further reading

External links
 

Organizations based in California
Conventions associated with the Southern Baptist Convention
Christian organizations established in 1940
Baptist denominations established in the 20th century
Baptist Christianity in California
1940 establishments in California